Anett Griffel (born 8 November 1990) is an Estonian model.  She has modeled for DKNY, Diane von Furstenberg, Doo.Ri, Jill Stuart, Vera Wang, Vivienne Tam and others.

References

External links

 
 
 

Estonian female models
Living people
1990 births
21st-century Estonian women